Fakaofo is a village on Fakaofo atoll in Tokelau. It is located to the north-west of the atoll. It is notable for its monument which is a coral slab personifying Tui Tokelau, a god once worshipped in the islands.

Fishing is important to the local economy  and food supply.

References
 Pacific Island travel

Populated places in Tokelau
Fakaofo